The Pequop Formation is a geologic formation in Nevada. It preserves fossils dating back to the Permian period.

See also

 List of fossiliferous stratigraphic units in Nevada
 Paleontology in Nevada

References
 

Permian geology of Nevada